Tashvand (also Romanized as Tashownd; also known as Tasmān) is a village in Miyandasht Rural District, in the Central District of Darmian County, South Khorasan Province, Iran. At the 2011 census, its population was 84, in 25 families.

References 

Populated places in Darmian County